Moldova elects a legislature at national level. The Parliament (Parlamentul) has 101 members, elected for a four-year term by proportional representation with a 6% electoral threshold. The President used to be elected for a four-year term by a constitutional majority of 60% members of the Parliament, but a Constitutional Court's ruling on 4 March 2016,  reverted the election method of the President to a two-round system direct election.

Parliamentary elections 
 1917 Sfatul Țării election
 1941 Moldavian Supreme Soviet election 
 Elections in the Moldavian SSR, 1946 
 Elections in the Moldavian SSR, 1950
 Elections in the Moldavian SSR, 1954
 Elections in the Moldavian SSR, 1958
 Elections in the Moldavian SSR, 1962
 Elections in the Moldavian SSR, 1966
 Elections in the Moldavian SSR, 1970
 Elections in the Moldavian SSR, 1974
 Elections in the Moldavian SSR, 1979
 Elections in the Moldavian SSR, 1984
 1990 Moldavian Supreme Soviet election
 1994 Moldovan parliamentary election
 1998 Moldovan parliamentary election 
 2001 Moldovan parliamentary election
 2005 Moldovan parliamentary election
 April 2009 Moldovan parliamentary election
 July 2009 Moldovan parliamentary election
 2010 Moldovan parliamentary election
 2014 Moldovan parliamentary election
 2019 Moldovan parliamentary election
 2021 Moldovan parliamentary election
 2025 Moldovan parliamentary election

Local elections 
1995 Moldovan local elections
1999 Moldovan local elections
2003 Moldovan local elections
2007 Moldovan local elections
2011 Moldovan local elections
2015 Moldovan local elections
2019 Moldovan local elections

Presidential elections 
 1991 Moldovan presidential election
 1996 Moldovan presidential election
 2001 Moldovan presidential election
 2005 Moldovan presidential election
 May–June 2009 Moldovan presidential election 
 November–December 2009 Moldovan presidential election
 2011–2012 Moldovan presidential election
 2016 Moldovan presidential election
 2020 Moldovan presidential election
 2024 Moldovan presidential election

Referendums 
1994 Moldovan referendum
1999 Moldovan constitutional referendum
2010 Moldovan constitutional referendum
2019 Moldovan referendum

See also
 Electoral calendar
 Electoral system

References

External links
Elections in Moldova
Early Parliamentary Elections in Moldova on 29 July 2009
Parliamentary Elections in Moldova on 5 April 2009
Parliamentary elections in Moldova on 6 March 2005
Adam Carr's Election Archive
Parties and elections